The men's individual road race was a road bicycle racing event held as part of the Cycling at the 1964 Summer Olympics programme. It was held on 22 October 1964. The course, just short of 25 kilometres, was covered 8 times for a total distance of 194.832 kilometres. 132 cyclists from 35 nations competed. The maximum number of cyclists per nation was four. The event was won by Mario Zanin of Italy, the nation's second victory in the men's individual road race and third consecutive Games in the top two. Kjell Rodian earned Denmark's first medal in the event with his silver. Walter Godefroot's bronze was Belgium's fifth medal in five Games (with 2 in 1952 making up for missing the podium in 1956).

Background

This was the seventh appearance of the event, previously held in 1896 and then at every Summer Olympics since 1936. It replaced the individual time trial event that had been held from 1912 to 1932 (and which would be reintroduced alongside the road race in 1996). Eddy Merckx of Belgium was the reigning world champion and the only one of the last four world champions to compete (the other three had all turned professional).

The Republic of China, Hong Kong, Iran, Malaysia, Mongolia, the Philippines, and Thailand each made their debut in the men's individual road race. Great Britain made its seventh appearance in the event, the only nation to have competed in each appearance to date.

Competition format and course

The mass-start race was on a course that covered eight laps of a 24.354 kilometres circuit starting at the Takao train station, for a total of 194.832 kilometres. It was a "relatively easy course" that "featured a fairly steep, but short, climb of 65 metres at the 11th km., followed by a short descent, and then a mild climb over the next few kilometres." The course ran into Hachioji, across the Asakawa Bridge, to Sanyu Corner, then northwest to Tobuki Cross with a detour to Takatsuki Terminal, then back south to Takao station again. It was a shorter version of the team time trial course, which went out to the Hino Bridge before looping back to Sanyu Corner.

Schedule

All times are Japan Standard Time (UTC+9)

Results

Nobody was able to make a successful breakaway, with 99 riders closely bunched throughout the race. The best attempts all fell short with no effective tries in the last 15 kilometres. Merckx had a late effort with 1.5 kilometres left but never got more than 20 metres clear of the pack. Zanin and Rodian reached the front in the final sprint, though all 99 cyclists in the pack finished within two tenths of a second of Zanin. Precise order within the pack, particularly after 35th place, is disputed.

Notes

References

Cycling at the Summer Olympics – Men's road race
Road cycling at the 1964 Summer Olympics